The Shop on Main Street (Czech/Slovak: Obchod na korze; in the UK The Shop on the High Street) is a 1965 Czechoslovakian film about the Aryanization program during World War II in the Slovak State.

The film was written by Ladislav Grosman and directed by Ján Kadár and Elmar Klos. It was funded by the Czechoslovakian central authorities (as were all films under the Communist regime), produced at the Barrandov Film Studio in Prague, and filmed with a Slovak cast on location in the town of Sabinov in north-eastern Slovakia and on the Barrandov sound stage. It stars Jozef Kroner as the Slovak carpenter Tóno Brtko and Polish actress Ida Kamińska as the Jewish widow Rozália Lautmannová.

The film won the 1965 Academy Award for Best Foreign Language Film, and Kamińska was nominated one year later for Best Actress in a Leading Role. It was entered into the 1965 Cannes Film Festival.

Plot

During World War II in a small town in the First Slovak Republic (a client state of Nazi Germany), mild-mannered Slovak carpenter Antonín "Tóno" Brtko is chosen by his brother-in-law, who holds an influential position in the local fascist government, to take over the sewing notions (i.e. haberdasher) shop owned by the elderly Jewish widow Rozália Lautmannová as part of the Aryanization efforts in the country. While Brtko is struggling to explain to Lautmannová, who is nearly deaf, oblivious to the outside world, and generally confused, that he is now her supervisor, Imrich Kuchár, Brtko's friend and a Slovak who opposes Aryanization, enters and informs Brtko that the business is unprofitable and Lautmannová relies on donations to make ends meet. Kuchár tells Lautmannová that Brtko has come to help her and connects Brtko with the leadership of the Jewish community of the town, who agree to pay him a regular salary to remain the official Aryan controller of the shop, since, if he quits, he might be replaced by someone more militantly fascist or anti-Semitic.

Brtko lets Lautmannová continue to run things in her shop, spending most of his time fixing her furniture or ineptly trying to assist her with customers, and the pair begin to develop a close relationship. When he hears that the authorities are going to gather the Jewish citizenry of the town and transport them elsewhere en masse, he does not tell Lautmannová and at first considers hiding her, but he starts to question this course of action when the roundup actually begins. Drinking steadily, he eventually loses his nerve and attempts to cajole and then force Lautmannová to join her friends in the street. She finally recognizes that a pogrom is happening and panics. Brtko chases her around inside the shop, but he stops and feels ashamed of himself after he witnesses his other Jewish neighbors actually being carted away. Seeing some soldiers heading toward the shop, he throws Lautmannová, who is in a frenzy, into a closet to hide her. The soldiers just glance in the window and keep walking. When Brtko opens the closet door, he discovers Lautmannová's dead body, and, devastated, hangs himself. The movie ends with a fantasy sequence in which the now deceased Lautmannová and Brtko run and dance through the town square together.

Cast

The Shop on Main Street was filmed on location at the town of Sabinov in north-eastern Slovakia with numerous local extras, whose voices bring in hints of the eastern regional variety of Slovak. Ida Kamińska's Polish accent is employed to the same effect.

Screenplay 
The screenplay had a bilingual Czech/Slovak history. The screenwriter Ladislav Grosman (1921–1981) was born and grew up in Slovakia, but he was writing in Czech at that point in his career. He published the short story "The Trap" ("Past"), a precursor to the screenplay that contained three themes that made it into the final film, in Czech in 1962. He reworked and expanded this story, still in Czech, as a literary-narrative screenplay that was published in 1964 under the title "The Shop on Main Street" (Obchod na korze). This version contained what would become the film's storyline, but it was not in a typical (American) screenplay format. Grosman reworked it into a shooting script with Slovak dialogue in cooperation with the film's designated directors, Ján Kadár and Elmar Klos.

The only other language in the film, other than Slovak, is Yiddish (which is sometimes misidentified as German), though this is limited to several lines that Mrs. Lautmannová mutters to herself. Her Hebrew reading from the siddur is indistinct.

Score
The score was composed by Zdenek Liska. It incorporates traditional brass band style music that would have been common in Czechoslovakia during the 1940s. The soundtrack was released on record in the US—the first Czechoslovak movie soundtrack to see such a release.

See also
 List of submissions to the 38th Academy Awards for Best Foreign Language Film
 List of Czechoslovak submissions for the Academy Award for Best International Feature Film
 List of films featuring the deaf and hard of hearing
 List of Czech Academy Award winners and nominees
 BFI Top 100 British films

Notes

References

Further reading

External links
 Steven Banovac, "Ján Kadár and Elmar Klos: The Shop on Main Street (Obchod na korze) 1965."
 
 
 
 The Shop on Main Street: Not the Six Million but the One an essay by Ján Kadár at the Criterion Collection
 The Shop on Main Street on Criterion Channel

1965 films
1960s war drama films
Czechoslovak drama films
Slovak-language films
Holocaust films
Czech war drama films
Best Foreign Language Film Academy Award winners
Films directed by Ján Kadár
1965 drama films
Czech World War II films
Czechoslovak World War II films